Humdrum Brown is a 1918 American silent comedy drama film directed by Rex Ingram and starring Henry B. Walthall, Mary Charleson and Dorothy Clark.

Cast
 Henry B. Walthall as Hector 'Humdrum' Brown 
 Mary Charleson as Alicia Boothe 
 Dorothy Clark as Grace Danforth
 Howard Crampton as Carlos Tanner 
 Kate Price as Cousin Kate 
 Joseph J. Dowling as John Fryeburg 
 Joe Harris as Ed Danforth 
 Ida Lewis as Aunt Elvira

References

Bibliography
 Leonhard Gmür. Rex Ingram: Hollywood's Rebel of the Silver Screen. 2013.

External links
 

1918 films
1918 comedy-drama films
American silent feature films
Films directed by Rex Ingram
American black-and-white films
Films distributed by W. W. Hodkinson Corporation
1910s English-language films
1910s American films
Silent American comedy-drama films